Teh tarik is a popular hot milk tea beverage most commonly found in restaurants, outdoor stalls, mamaks and kopitiams within the Southeast Asian countries of Malaysia, Indonesia, Singapore and Thailand. Its name is derived from the process of repeatedly pouring the drink from one container into another (or "pulling") with arms extended during preparation, which helps to slightly cool the tea for consumption and giving it a frothy head. It is made from a strong brew of black tea blended with condensed milk. It is the national drink of Malaysia.

Etymology
Teh tarik is formed by two languages: teh which means "tea" and tarik which means "pulled." The word "teh" for tea originates from the Hokkien word  for tea, the word "tarik" for pulled originates from Malay.

Origin and history 

The origins of  tarik can be traced to Indian Muslim immigrants in the Malay Peninsula who set up drink stalls at the entrance of rubber plantations after World War II to serve the workers there. Since colonial times,  tarik has been a popular Malaysian Indian cuisine for many in British Malaya and Singapore. Traditionally,  tarik has been seen served with the Roti canai which is a popular breakfast set among Malaysians and with prata among the Singaporeans.

An element of showmanship exists in the preparation of  tarik. The ability to drag a long stream of tea above the heads of the patrons without giving them a shower is an amusing novelty for the locals and tourists alike. In Malaysia, there are occasions where  tarik brewers gather for competitions and performances to show their skills. Teh tarik has become recognised along with nasi lemak as part of the food and beverage heritage of Malaysia by the Malaysian government ministry.

Preparation
The mixture is poured back and forth repeatedly between two vessels from a height, giving it a thick frothy top. This process cools the tea to optimal drinking temperatures, thoroughly mixes the tea with the condensed milk, and improves its flavour. This is often compared to the decanting of toddy to enhance its flavour.

The term kurang manis, which can be translated to "less sweet", is a common request for those who are health conscious or not fond of sugary drinks, as  tarik is typically prepared on the sweet side to taste by most vendors.

Variations

 Teh ais is tea sweetened with condensed milk that is simply served in a glass with ice cubes. It may also be known as  tarik ping or  tarik ais'' with the tarik treatment.
 Teh tarik madu is  tarik blended with honey as part of its preparation, which is usually served cold.
 Teh halia,  tarik flavoured with ginger.
 Teh madras, a variant popular in Sabah and Labuan, is made with frothed milky tea layered on top of hot milk.
 Teh-C is tea made with unsweetened evaporated milk, unlike the traditional  tarik which is made with sweetened condensed milk. Vendors however will add sugar to Teh-C unless specifically asked not to. The Malay word for nil or zero, kosong, is used to indicate that the drinker does not want their beverage to be sweetened. The ‘C’ stands for "Carnation", a popular brand of evaporated milk. A three-layered tea variation of the drink called Teh-C Peng Special are available and sold in most kopitiams, consisting of black tea, milk and palm sugar syrup from the top to bottom layer respectively. Teh-C ais is the iced drink version of it with ice cubes.
 Teh-O refers to black tea without any addition of dairy products or creamers entirely, hence the ‘O’ stands for "original". Like Teh-C, sugar is usually added except when Teh-O kosong is specified, where once again sugar is omitted. Teh O ais is the iced drink version of it with ice cubes.
 Kopi tarik is local coffee, dark roasted with margarine and sugar, which is sweetened with condensed milk and pulled to froth it up. Drinks made with Milo and Nescafe may also be served with the tarik treatment by vendors which specialise in  tarik.

In popular culture 
The drink has experienced resurgent popularity as a symbol of navigating conflict. As a common drink among disparate cultural groups, organisations throughout Malaysia such as schools, nonprofits, and government have been hosting "Teh tarik sessions" in which participants identify common ground and embrace diversity.

See also
 Thai tea
 Hong Kong-style milk tea
 Bubble tea
 Masala chai

References

Malaysian drinks
Singaporean drinks
Indonesian drinks
Blended tea
Singaporean cuisine
Bruneian cuisine
Thai drinks
Tea culture
Malaysian tea
Milk tea